Clarice Cross Bagwell (December 15, 1914 – September 26, 2001) was an American educator and activist. She was the first woman in Georgia to serve as forewoman of a grand jury, as well as one of the first special education teachers in the state of Georgia and the first in DeKalb County. She studied at Georgia State University, the University of Georgia, and West Georgia College. Bagwell also was president of the Georgia Parent Teacher Association and sat on the board of directors of the national PTA. Working for the PTA's Committee on International Relations, she visited Canada, Japan, Switzerland, and the USSR on goodwill and outreach missions.

Bagwell was born on December 15, 1914 in Pickens County, Georgia. She married chemist and teacher Leland Horace Bagwell, sometime after 1930. They had two children, David Leland Bagwell and Thomas Nathan Bagwell. Leland was the founder and CEO of American Proteins, founded in 1949 as the North Georgia Rendering Company; after his death in 1972 she became the company's chairman of the board and co-owner and ran it alongside their son, Tommy Bagwell. American Proteins would become the largest poultry renderer in the country before being purchased by Tyson Foods in 2018 for $850million. Bagwell never took a salary for her work.

Despite not being an alumni, Bagwell was a strong supporter of Kennesaw State University, where she served as a trustee for 18 years, was in charge of the KSU Foundation's Special Projects Committee, and in 1997 received the first honorary doctorate of humane letters bestowed by the school. In 1996, the Bagwell family-owned American Proteins donated $2million worth of land,  in Bartow County, to the KSU Foundation, its largest gift at the time; the university's Bagwell College of Education is named in both her and her husband's honor, and the KSU Foundation's Bagwell Medal for Distinguished Service, established in 1991, is named after Clarice.

Additionally, Bagwell was a charter member of the Georgia Conservancy, the Georgia Federation of Business, and the Professional Women's Club; was appointed by three governors to Georgia's State Crimes Commission; initiated Cherokee County's first roadside park program along SR20; and served as president of the Georgia Legislative Forum and a chairperson on the National Council on Crime and Delinquency.

Bagwell received commendations from the American Cancer Society, the Community Concert Association, and the Heart Association. In March 2020, Bagwell was added to the Georgia Women of Achievement Hall of Fame.

Clarice Bagwell died on September 26, 2001 in Cumming, Georgia at the age of 86.

Footnotes

References

1914 births
2001 deaths
American educators
Kennesaw State University people
Georgia State University alumni
University of Georgia alumni
University of West Georgia alumni